Makarora is a small community within the Queenstown-Lakes District of the Otago region of the South Island of New Zealand.

Local tourism operators offer scenic plane flights and jetboating tours on the Makarora River, which is the border of the Mount Aspiring National Park. The 2022 film Nude Tuesday was shot at the Wonderland Lodge in Makarora.

Demographics

Outer Wanaka had a population of 399 at the 2018 New Zealand census, an increase of 21 people (5.6%) since the 2013 census, and an increase of 63 people (18.8%) since the 2006 census. There were 162 households. There were 204 males and 192 females, giving a sex ratio of 1.06 males per female. The median age was 45.1 years (compared with 37.4 years nationally), with 72 people (18.0%) aged under 15 years, 57 (14.3%) aged 15 to 29, 228 (57.1%) aged 30 to 64, and 36 (9.0%) aged 65 or older.

Ethnicities were 96.2% European/Pākehā, 10.5% Māori, 0.8% Asian, and 0.8% other ethnicities (totals add to more than 100% since people could identify with multiple ethnicities).

The proportion of people born overseas was 18.8%, compared with 27.1% nationally.

Although some people objected to giving their religion, 64.7% had no religion and 29.3% were Christian.

Of those at least 15 years old, 87 (26.6%) people had a bachelor or higher degree, and 21 (6.4%) people had no formal qualifications. The median income was $32,800, compared with $31,800 nationally. 63 people (19.3%) earned over $70,000 compared to 17.2% nationally. The employment status of those at least 15 was that 183 (56.0%) people were employed full-time, 78 (23.9%) were part-time, and 3 (0.9%) were unemployed.

Education

The school was first established in 1895.

References

Populated places in Otago
Queenstown-Lakes District